Mandusti (also Romanized as Mandūstī) is a village in Chah Dadkhoda Rural District, Chah Dadkhoda District, Qaleh Ganj County, Kerman Province, Iran. At the 2006 census, its population was 406, in 81 families.

References 

Populated places in Qaleh Ganj County